Bédeille is the name of the following communes in France:

 Bédeille, Ariège, in the Ariège department
 Bédeille, Pyrénées-Atlantiques, in the Pyrénées-Atlantiques department